Leptosteges onirophanta is a moth in the family Crambidae. It was described by Harrison Gray Dyar Jr. in 1914 and is found in Panama.

The wingspan is about 9 mm. The wings are white, with a dark brown costa to near the middle. The lines are pale brown. Adults have been recorded on wing from April to May and from August to November.

References

Moths described in 1914
Schoenobiinae